Scott Paul Smart (born 29 May 1975) is a British motorcycle racer and an occasional TV commentator for Channel 4.  He is the son of Paul Smart, and the nephew of Barry Sheene.

Racing career
Scott won the Superteen series in 1994, and he was 1997 250cc British Champion, having previously finished as series runner-up, before making a move up to the 500cc World Championship the next year. He was not successful here, and after some 250cc races a year later he spent several years in British Supersport, finishing as runner-up in 2002.

British Superbikes
He did his first full season in British Superbike in 2003 for Hawk Kawasaki, finishing 9th overall, with a string of top 10 finishes as well as twice qualifying on the front row. He then took 3 wins to finish 4th in 2004. This earned him a prestigious ride with Rizla Suzuki alongside reigning champion John Reynolds for 2005, but he struggled on the bike and left the team mid-season, joining the small Vivaldi racing team, but missing some races with a broken collarbone. He started 2006 with a bang, winning a chaotic wet round 3 at Donington Park, but has not been among the front-runners in the dry on his semi-works Suzuki. Late in the season he sustained a broken wrist, and did a technical piece about engine specifications whilst still in plaster. Confusingly, this was broadcast hours after he had raced in the BSB season finale, finishing 6th in race one. For 2007 he returned to Hawk Kawasaki, but had an uncompetitive start to the season.

British Superstock 1000
Scott moved down to the stock class in 2009 with the Moto Rapido Ducati team, he was pencilled in to move back to the British Superbike Championship class in 2010 under the Evo regulations, however after one of their sponsors dropped out Smart stayed in the stock class for 2010.

Radio Control
Scott is also very active in Radio Controlled models, mainly touring cars and 1/12 Pan/Le Mans. He has raced at British National level, and has even represented the BRCA at the 1/12 European Championships.

During his spare time, Scott is a contributor to the UK RC Car magazine Radio Controlled Car Racer

Career statistics
Stats correct as of 9 July 2012

By championship

British Superbike Championship

 * Season still in progress

Notes
1. – E Denotes riders participating in the Evo class within the British Superbike Championship.

See also
2006 British Superbike season

References

External links
British Superbike official site profile

British motorcycle racers
English motorcycle racers
Living people
1975 births
British Supersport Championship riders
British Superbike Championship riders
500cc World Championship riders
250cc World Championship riders